The 2016 Summit League men's soccer tournament, was the 11th edition of the tournament. It determined the Summit League's automatic berth into the 2016 NCAA Division I Men's Soccer Championship.

The Denver Pioneers won The Summit League title, besting the Omaha Mavericks, 2–1 in the championship match. It was Denver's fourth Summit League title and their fourth consecutive.

The tournament was hosted by the University of Denver and all matches were contested at CIBER Field at the University of Denver Soccer Stadium.

Seeds
The top four teams participate in the tournament. The seeding is based on the program's conference record during the 2016 Summit League season.

Oral Roberts and Fort Wayne also had 2–4 conference records but a poorer goal differential

Bracket

Results

Semifinals

Championship

Statistical leaders

Top goalscorers

References 

tournament 2016
Summit League Men's Soccer
Summit League Men's Soccer Tournament